is an 2007 Japanese film directed by Naomi Kawase. It won the Grand Prix at the 2007 Cannes Film Festival. It tells the story of a nurse (played by Machiko Ono) who is grieving for her dead child.  She works at a nursing home and grows close to an elderly man (Shigeki Uda), suffering from dementia, who is searching in the local forest for something connected to his dead wife that he cannot explain.

Plot 
Elder Shigeki lives in a retirement home where he is lovingly cared for by Nurse Machiko, who is grieving the loss of a child. After celebrating Shigeki's birthday, the two take a trip to the countryside. The man, followed by Machiko, goes into the forest and, after two days of walking made difficult by the dense vegetation, they reach the place where Shigeki's wife is buried. Machiko learns that the man has been writing to his wife for 33 years, and is now preparing to write her the last letter.

Awards 
2007 Cannes Film Festival
Awarded as "Grand Prix"

Cast
 Yōichirō Saitō - Machiko's husband
 Kanako Masuda - Mako
 Machiko Ono - Machiko
 Shigeki Uda - Shigeki
 Makiko Watanabe - Wakako

References

External links
 

2007 films
2000s Japanese-language films
Films directed by Naomi Kawase
2007 drama films
Japanese drama films
Cannes Grand Prix winners
2000s Japanese films